Saweety Boora, also known mononymously as Saweety, is an Indian boxer who competes in the middleweight weight class. She won the silver medal in light heavyweight class at the 2014 AIBA Women's World Boxing Championships. Her sister  Siwi boora also an indian boxer .

Early and personal life
Boora was born on 10 January 1993 in rural Hisar, Haryana. Her father Mahender Singh, a farmer, played basketball at the national level. Boora was a state-level kabaddi player before switching to boxing in 2009 at the insistence of her father. She initially trained in the farmlands near Chaudhary Charan Singh Haryana Agricultural University and had to move out of Haryana in order to pursue a career in the sport. Siwi Boora is the younger sister of Saweety Boora.

On 7 July 2022, Boora married Deepak Niwas Hooda.

Career
At the 2014 AIBA Women's World Boxing Championships in Jeju City, Boora won the silver medal in the light heavyweight (81 kg) event after losing the final to China's Yang Xiaoli. Boora was the only Indian to reach the final of an event at the 2015 Asian Women's Amateur Boxing Championships in Wulanchabu where she settled for silver after losing to the same opponent.

In 2017, Boora received Government of Haryana's Bhim Award for her sporting achievements in the 2015–16 season. In 2018, she changed her weight class from light heavyweight (81 kg) to middleweight (75 kg) as the former is not part of the Summer Olympics. She was eliminated in the pre-quarterfinal round of the 2019 AIBA Women's World Boxing Championships.

References

External links
 Saweety Boora at Indian Boxing Federation
 Saweety Boora at BoxRec

1993 births
Living people
Indian women boxers
Middleweight boxers
People from Hisar (city)
Sportswomen from Haryana
AIBA Women's World Boxing Championships medalists